Sivacobus is an extinct species of antelope that lived in South Asia during the Plio-Pleistocene.

Sivacobus was the only known member of the antelope subfamily Reduncinae to occur outside of Africa. Previously, the Asian reduncines were assigned to at least six genera, but newer studies suggest that only three species, all in Sivacobus, are valid.
Most records of this genus are known from the Siwalik Pinjor Formation dated from 2.7 to 0.6 Ma. In 2015 a new species named Sivacobus sankaliai was described from an assemblage near Gopnath, northwestern India. The assemblage has been dated to under 200 ka, extending the temporal range of the genus, by over 300,000 years.

References

Prehistoric bovids
Pliocene even-toed ungulates
Pleistocene even-toed ungulates
Prehistoric mammals of Asia
Pliocene mammals of Asia
Pleistocene mammals of Asia
Pleistocene extinctions
Prehistoric even-toed ungulate genera